William Atchison O'Neill (August 11, 1930November 24, 2007) was an American politician and member of the Democratic Party who served as the 84th Governor of Connecticut from 1980 to 1991. He was the second longest-serving governor in Connecticut history, with 10 years in office.

Biography
O'Neill was born in Hartford, Connecticut, the son of Joseph and Frances O'Neill, He was educated at Teachers College of Connecticut (now Central Connecticut State University) and the University of Hartford but left without matriculating. He married Natalie Scott "Nikki" Damon in 1962. He sold insurance for Prudential Insurance Company.

Career
O'Neill served as a combat pilot with the U.S. Air Force during the Korean War from 1950 to 1953.  He was a member of the American Legion and the Veterans of Foreign Wars. Upon his return, he ran the family business—an East Hampton tavern where residents and politicians often met and where he, by his own admission, learned to listen.

Elected to six terms in the Connecticut House of Representatives, O'Neill served as majority leader from 1975 to 1976 and 1977 to 1978. He was House assistant minority leader and assistant majority leader. He chaired the Coalition of Northeastern Governors and the New England Governors' Conference and was president of the Council of State Governments.

O'Neill was elected the 102nd Lieutenant Governor of Connecticut in 1978 on a Democratic ticket along with Governor Ella Grasso. When Grasso resigned for health reasons in December 1980 (she would pass away the following February), O'Neill became Governor and was elected to a full term in 1982 and re-elected in 1986. He benefited from the economic boom Connecticut enjoyed during the 1980s when the state's job growth was at a recent historic peak. The state enjoyed large budget surpluses in this era. His large re-election victory in 1986 over Lowell Weicker ally Julie Belaga had an effect on the state legislature, which gained large majorities of liberal Democrats eager to expand state government, such as House Speaker Irving Stolberg.

The 1990 recession hit Connecticut very hard, with the real estate, banking and defense industries all faltering with resultant job losses and tax revenue losses. Facing plummeting approval ratings and a budget situation continuing to deteriorate despite the 1989 tax hike, O'Neill decided in early 1990 to bow out of a re-election bid.

Death and legacy
O'Neill died from emphysema on November 24, 2007, aged 77. He is interred at Connecticut State Veterans Cemetery, Middletown, Connecticut. A terminal at Bradley International Airport is named in his honor.

He was eulogized by his fellow Connecticut politicians as Trumanesque. "I always thought the secret to his success was that he was genuine," said John Droney, who was chairman of the state Democratic party during O'Neill's last term. "He was honest. And he projected the image of an ordinary man called upon to do extraordinary things. He was, in my view, the Harry Truman of Connecticut." Republican state chairman Chris Healy called O'Neill "a good and decent man who served his state and country with distinction."

References

William Oneill

External links
The Political Graveyard
National Governors Association
William A. O'Neill: Connecticut State Archives

Connecticut State Library
 

Deaths from emphysema
Democratic Party governors of Connecticut
Lieutenant Governors of Connecticut
Democratic Party members of the Connecticut House of Representatives
Politicians from Hartford, Connecticut
1930 births
2007 deaths
Drinking establishment owners
Military personnel from Connecticut
20th-century American politicians